Serta is an American company based in Hoffman Estates, Illinois, that specializes in developing and manufacturing mattresses.  It was founded in 1931 in Illinois as Sleeper, Inc. by 13 mattress manufacturers who licensed the Serta name; subsequently, eight independent licensees acting like a cooperative owned the company. Afterwards, it was controlled and operated as Serta International by its largest licensee, National Bedding Company (which ultimately held 27 of the 34 U.S. Serta manufacturing licenses). In 2005, two private equity groups teamed up to purchase National Bedding Co.--The Ares Corporate Opportunities Fund, the Los Angeles-based private equity fund of Ares Management; and Teachers’ Private Capital, the private equity arm of the Ontario (Canada) Teachers’ Pension Plan. The American company  Serta International is a subsidiary of the American company Serta Simmons Bedding, LLC of Doraville, Georgia.  Other licensees include Serta Dormae in Texas, Serta Restokraft in Michigan, and Salt Lake Mattress in Utah.

Serta is the largest mattress brand in the United States, and offers four main types of mattresses – traditional inner spring, gel-infused memory foam, hybrid mattresses which combine both, and the Salt Lake City plant exclusively produces a Talalay Latex collection. Serta products are used extensively in the lodging industry, with Hilton Worldwide and Wyndham Worldwide among its customers. Serta mattresses are also offered on cable home shopping channel ShopNBC. In August 2018, Serta Simmons Bedding, LLC announced a merger with online retailer Tuft & Needle.

On January 23, 2023, Serta Simmons Bedding filed for Chapter 11 bankruptcy.

Counting Sheep

The company is famous for its "Counting Sheep" advertising campaign which were animated by Aardman Animations and first created in 2000. The counting sheep are shown to be desperate for work in wanting people to sleep at night, but get frustrated whenever they found out people have a Serta mattress.

During the 2000s, the sheep were all animated using Aardman's trademark use of stop-motion clay animation, made to resemble the style of Nick Park's works in Wallace and Gromit, Chicken Run, and Creature Comforts. By the 2010s, the sheeps' animation style switched from stop-motion to CGI, and despite still using the same character designs from before, and still being done by Aardman, the animation style for the counting sheep from the 2010s and onwards were made to resemble the style of Flushed Away, which was also produced by Aardman.

Counting sheep voice cast
Brian McFadden
Maurice LaMarche
Phil LaMarr
Kari Wahlgren
Danny Rutigliano
Carlos Alazraqui
Billy West
Richard Steven Horvitz

See also
Bedding
Bed
Futon

References

External links
Serta website

Manufacturing companies established in 1931
Franchises
Companies that filed for Chapter 11 bankruptcy in 2023
Cooperatives in the United States
Manufacturing companies based in Illinois
Companies based in Cook County, Illinois
1931 establishments in Illinois
Mattress retailers of the United States
Hoffman Estates, Illinois
2012 mergers and acquisitions
Aardman Animations